Woon is a surname with various origins. It is a word in the old Cornish language, meaning 'downlander', and remains a common name in Cornwall. It is also one possible spelling of the Minnan pronunciation of the Chinese surname romanized in Mandarin pinyin as Wen (溫).

People with the Chinese surname Woon include:
Woon Sui Kut (1929–2013), Singaporean sports official
Woon Swee Oan (born 1954), Malaysian writer
Woon Tai Ho (born 1958), Singaporean journalist
Walter Woon (born 1956), Attorney General of Singapore
Woon Khe Wei (born 1989), Malaysian badminton player

Other people with the surname Woon include:
John Woon (1823–?), U.S. Navy sailor during the American Civil War
Basil Woon (1893–1974), British-born American writer
Peter Woon (1931–2014), British journalist
Andy Woon (born 1952), British football forward
Jamie Woon (born 1983), British singer

Chinese-language surnames
Cornish-language surnames
Hokkien-language surnames